Sohbatpur or Sohbat Pur is a city in the Pakistani province of Balochistan and the headquarters of  Sohbatpur District, until 2012 It was a Tehsil of Jaffarabad District. This district, Sohbatpur, was created district by the then Caretaker Prime Minister of Pakistan Mir Hazar Khan Khoso in May 2013.

References 

Populated places in Balochistan, Pakistan
Populated places in Sohbatpur District